Cambaroides is a genus of freshwater crayfish from eastern Asia (eastern Russia, northeastern China, Korean Peninsula and Japan). Together with Astacus, they are the only crayfish native to Asia. Cambaroides contains about six species:

 Cambaroides dauricus (Pallas, 1772)
 Cambaroides japonicus (De Haan, 1841)
 Cambaroides koshewnikowi (Birstein & Vinogradov, 1934)
 Cambaroides sachalinensis (De Haan, 1841)
 Cambaroides schrenckii (Kessler, 1874)
 Cambaroides similis (Koelbel, 1892)
 Cambaroides wladiwostokiensis Birstein & Vinogradov, 1934

References

Cambaridae
Decapod genera
Taxa named by Walter Faxon